The 2012 Big 12 Conference football season was the 17th season for the Big 12, as part of the 2012 NCAA Division I FBS football season.  It was also the first season in the Big 12 for TCU and West Virginia, replacing Texas A&M and Missouri, as they both moved to the Southeastern Conference.

Head coaches
	

 Art Briles, Baylor	
 Paul Rhoads, Iowa State	
 Charlie Weis, Kansas
 Bill Snyder, Kansas State	
 Bob Stoops, Oklahoma	
	
 Mike Gundy, Oklahoma State
 Mack Brown, Texas
 Gary Patterson, Texas Christian
 Tommy Tuberville, Texas Tech	
 Dana Holgorsen, West Virginia

Rankings

Schedule

Week one

Week two

.

Week three

Week four

Week five

Week six

Week seven

Week eight

Week nine

Week ten

Week eleven

Week twelve

Week thirteen

Week fourteen

Records against other conferences

Big 12 vs. BCS matchups

Bowl games
Big 12 teams played in the following bowl games. Big 12 teams are bolded.

Every team except for the Kansas Jayhawks played in a bowl game for the 2012 season.  Every one of the Jayhawk's opponents played in a bowl game (for FBS teams) except South Dakota State, a FCS team that played two rounds in the FCS Football Championship.

Players of the week
Following each week of games, Big 12 conference officials select the players of the week from the conference's teams.

Position key

References

External links
2012 College Football Season at ESPN